

The Cannobino is a little river or stream located in the province of Verbano Cusio Ossola in the region of Piedmont in the north of Italy, which by the local population often is simply called 'Il Fiume' (the river).

Basin
The Cannobino rises on the slopes of the Italian Alps near the Cima della Laurasca, elevation , and meanders through the Cannobino valley (in Italian 'Valle Cannobina').

Torrente
In general the Cannobino is a quietly flowing stream, but a couple of times a year the influx of water from the surrounding mountains suddenly increases strongly, causing the stream to change into a wild watermass. For this reason the Cannobino is called a 'torrente'.

Recreation
The Cannobino is mainly used for recreational purposes. A number of campgrounds and hotels are situated on its banks and near the Sant'Anna cleft the stream is wide and deep enough for diving, swimming and sailing rubber boats.

External links
 Overview of the entire course of the Cannobino on Google maps

Rivers of the Province of Verbano-Cusio-Ossola
Rivers of the Alps
Rivers of Italy